Shain may refer to:

Places
Shain, alternate name of Hashatjin, a city in Ardabil Province, Iran

People
Charles Alexander Shain (1922–1960), Australian astronomer
Eva Shain (1918–1999), American boxing judge
Irving Shain (1926–2018), American academic
Jon Shain (born 1967), American folk musician
Merle Shain (1935–1989), Canadian author and journalist
Ruchoma Shain (1914–2013), American teacher and author
Yossi Shain (born 1956), Israeli academic and politician

See also
Shaina
Shein